Kumlien is a surname of Swedish origin. Notable people with the surname include:

 Akke Kumlien (1884–1949) Swedish calligrapher and graphic designer
 Axel Kumlien (1833–1913) Swedish architect
 Hjalmar Kumlien (1837–1897) Swedish architect
 Thure Kumlien (1819–1888) Swedish-American ornithologist and biologist

See also
 Birgitta Kumlien-Nyheim (b. 1942) Swedish-Norwegian painter
 a typeface in the Stempel Type Foundry, named after Akke Kumlien
 Kumlien's gull